The 2014 NCAA Division I women's soccer season was the 33rd season of NCAA championship women's college soccer. The UCLA Bruins were the defending national champions.

Season overview

Standings

See also 
 College soccer
 List of NCAA Division I women's soccer programs
 2014 in American soccer
 2014 NCAA Division I Women's Soccer Tournament
 2014 NCAA Division I men's soccer season

References 

 
NCAA, Women